This is a list of the Wales women's national football team results and scheduled fixtures from 2020 to the present.

Fixtures and results

2020

2021

2022

2023

References

External links
 

Wales women's national football team
2020s in Wales